The 1964 Tulane Green Wave football team was an American football team that represented Tulane University during the 1964 NCAA University Division football season as a member of the Southeastern Conference. In their third year under head coach Tommy O'Boyle, the team compiled a 3–7 record.

Schedule

Notes

References

Tulane
Tulane Green Wave football seasons
Tulane Green Wave football